The Constitutionalist Party of Iran–Liberal Democrat (Hezbé Mashruté Iran-Liberal Demokrat) is an Iranian exiled monarchist political party. The party condemns the Iranian Revolution and is waiting for the return of the monarchy under Reza Pahlavi.

German authorities believe the group "is not a serious danger to Iran since its activities are limited to propaganda against the regime."

References

External links
Official website

Liberal parties in Iran
Monarchist parties in Iran
Political parties established in 1994
Banned political parties in Iran
Secularism in Iran
1994 establishments in Iran